Third Coast Percussion is a Grammy Award-winning American percussion ensemble, based in Chicago, Illinois, United States.

The group, composed of Sean Connors, Robert Dillon, Peter Martin, and David Skidmore, specializes in new music/contemporary classical music and is known for its touring and recording activities. 

Third Coast Percussion is the Ensemble-in-Residence at the University of Notre Dame’s DeBartolo Performing Arts Center. They are the first ensemble at the University of Notre Dame to create a permanent and progressive ensemble residency program at the center. The ensemble performs multiple recitals annually as part of the DeBartolo Performing Arts Center’s Presenting Series season. Third Coast Percussion assumed the position of Ensemble-in-Residence at Notre Dame in 2013.

The album Third Coast Percussion | Steve Reich won a Grammy Award for Best Chamber Music/Small Ensemble Performance, becoming the first percussion group to win in a chamber music category. Third Coast Percussion has released albums on the Mode, New Focus, New Amsterdam, and Cedille record labels.  The quartet endorses and performs exclusively with Pearl/Adams Musical Instruments, Zildjian Cymbals, Remo Drumheads, and Vic Firth sticks and mallets.

History

Formation and early years
In 2004, original members, Anthony Calabrese, Robert Dillon, Jacob Nissly, and David Skidmore were all percussionists with the Civic Orchestra of Chicago, as well as students of Northwestern University. Along with their performance work with the ensemble, they formed a chamber percussion group that traveled throughout the Chicago area, performing at Chicago Public Schools and city colleges as an educational device. Although not using their signature title, it was from this humble engagement that the group Third Coast Percussion was created.

The first shows by Third Coast Percussion that were non-educational based were performed in the summer of 2005, the very first two being performed at Northwestern and the Music Institute of Chicago in Evanston. In the summer of that same year, the group took a slight turn when Jake Nissly left for graduate studies at Juilliard School of music As a result, Peter Martin, a Northwestern percussionist pursuing a doctoral degree, filled the spot in the group. In addition to Nisslys departure, member Anthony Calabrese would move on to concentrate on his school-work at Northwestern at the time. Former Member Owen Clayton Condon, an alumnus from Northwestern and professor at Northeastern, would take Calabrese's place.

Rehearsing during the night at Northwestern and Northeastern University for a brief time, the group began tackling their goals as an ensemble. The unique concept of Third Coasts repertoire was something that the group developed early on, influenced by a series of restraints that they dealt with. As a young group, many of their gigs, such as performances at the Empty Bottle, were small venues with a limited amount of space to perform. This would put a restriction on the number of instruments and the type of repertoire performed by the group. These restrictions were instrumental in the selection process of the music that Third Coast performed, as well as the development of the group’s style.

On February 12, 2006, TCP played at the Neo-Futurarium, a gig that turned out to break open the doors for the group. It was at this performance that they first met Ethelbert Williams, as of 2020 a longtime board member of TCP. Williams, an expert in marketing, was a member of the audience at this concert. Impressed with the ensembles performance, Mr. Williams decided to invite TCP to work with him. Ethelbert Williams was essential in helping to create a presentable package for the group that they could promote to the music world on a much broader scale.

Present day
Third Coast Percussion has since evolved from solely acting as an educational group associated with the Civic Orchestra of Chicago, to a full-time working music ensemble, with Sean Connors assuming Condon's place in the ensemble in 2013.

Grammy Award
Third Coast Percussion won a Grammy Award for Best Chamber Music/Small Ensemble Performance for their album Third Coast Percussion | Steve Reich, released on Cedille Records. They are the first percussion group to win in a chamber music category. The album featured entirely music of American composer Steve Reich in honor of his eightieth birthday and received high praise from Reich himself: "When I heard the Third Coast CD of a number of my pieces...I thought, 'Wow, you know, I've never heard them this way.' You have to literally lean in to listen. Which is a very good way to listen. And the whole thing just knocked my socks off." Third Coast Percussion performed music from the album at the 59th Annual Grammy Awards and were joined by jazz saxophonist Ravi Coltrane for the performance.

Repertoire

Original music
Condon: Double Helix (2005)
Condon: Fractalia (2011)
Condon: Quadruple Helix (2005)
Dillon: Ordering-instincts (2014)
Martin: BEND (2016)
Martin: WAVES (2014)
Skidmore: Aliens with Extraordinary Abilities (2016)
Skidmore: Common Patterns in Uncommon Time (2011)
Skidmore: Echoes (2003)
Skidmore: Fanfare for a New Audience (2009)
Skidmore: In Contact (2006)
Skidmore: Ritual Music (2004)
Skidmore: Trying (2014)
Third Coast Percussion: Paddle to the Sea (2017)
Third Coast Percussion: Reaction Yield (2016)

Works commissioned
100 different composers: RENGA:Cage:100
Christopher Adler: Pines Long Slept in Sunshine
Timo Andres: Austerity Measures (2013)
Marcos Balter: dark rooms (2007)
Matthew Barnson: Percussion Quartet (2006)
Mark Berger: Percussion Quartet (2006)
Martin Bresnick: A Message from the Emperor
Kirsten Broberg: Constellations (2008)
Christopher Cerrone: Goldbeater's Skin (2017)
Danny Clay: playbook (2015)
Adam Cuthbert: democracy looks like
Thomas DeLio: ...sound / shivering / silence II
Donnacha Dennehy: Surface Tension (2016)
Christopher Fischer-Lochhead: On Tenterhooks (2012-2013)
Ted Hearne: Thaw (2009)
Ben Hjertmann: Automatic Glitch (2014)
Ryan Ingebritsen: Improvisation in an Altered State (2013)
Derek Jacoby: We’ve Gotta Find It (2006)
Jlin: Perspectives (2020, commissioned by the Boulanger Initiative)
Glenn Kotche: Stones Flow
Glenn Kotche: Wild Sound (2014)
Andrew McKenna Lee: Like A Sick, Breathing Tambura (2006)
David T. Little: Haunt of Last Nightfall (2010)
José Martínez: Two Questions About Time (2017)
Marc Mellits: Gravity (2013)
Otto Muller: Escoria (2010)
Anthony Pateras: Lost Compass (2010)
Jonathan Pfeffer: Jonathan was killed in battle against the Philistines
Christopher Preissing: Point Line Space I: Sticks and Stones
Annika Socolofsky: bellow (2017)
Stephen Syverud: Snow Creatures
Augusta Read Thomas: Resounding Earth (2012)
Augusta Read Thomas: Selene
Augusta Read Thomas: Wonderful Things! (Tomorrow Sings with Hope)
Aaron Travers: Deep Carving (2006)
Dmitri Tymoczko: Röckdöts (2013)
Katherine Young: just water, no lemon (2017)

Discography 
Original Albums
Ritual Music (2008) 
John Cage - The Works for Percussion, vol. 2 (2012)   
Resounding Earth (2013) 
Haunt of Last NightFall (2014) 
Unknown Symmetry (2013)
Third Coast Percussion | Steve Reich (2016)
Phillipe Manoury - Book of Keyboards (2017)
Paddle to the Sea (2018)
Albums featuring Third Coast Percussion
 Lei Liang - Luminous (2016)
 Jeff Herriott - The Stone Tapestry (2017) 
 David T. Little, Third Coast Percussion - Haunt of Last Nightfall  (2014)
 *AND (Various Artists) Thaw - Ted Hearne (2013)
 Augusta Read Thomas: Of Being is a Bird (2016)
 Augusta Read Thomas: Astral Canticle (2015)
 Augusta Read Thomas: Ritual Incantations (2017)
 Devonté Hynes - Fields (2019)

References

Percussion ensembles
Cedille Records artists